On Pointe is a children's novel about an aspiring ballet dancer by Lorie Ann Grover, first published in 2004.

It was nominated for the 2006 Dorothy Canfield Fisher Children's Book Award.

Plot summary
This story is told in free verse. The novel centers on 16-year-old Clare, who has dreamed of becoming a dancer all her life and has worked hard to achieve her dreams. She hopes to be selected for City Ballet, a program for very skilled dancers, although there are only sixteen positions available. After a growth spurt, she is judged too tall for professional ballet and advised to take a dance class for adult amateurs. It seems her dream is crushed, but when her grandfather has a stroke, losing the ability to talk and move his right side, her perspective alters.

Reception

School Library Journal said that the novel was "finely written", and commented of the main character that "the teen's voice rings true". Publishers Weekly described it as "well-wrought" with "an air of authenticity". Booklist was less positive, feeling that the grandfather's stroke was "perhaps overly convenient" and that the "shift in focus from ballet-studio pressures to family dynamics feels a bit jarring". Kirkus Reviews said that the protagonist was "almost too good to be true, but she'll appeal to teens interested in dance".

References

2004 American novels
American children's novels
Verse novels
2004 children's books
Books about ballet
Margaret K. McElderry books